The 2005 Radivoj Korać Cup was the third season of the Serbian-Montenegrin men's national basketball cup tournament. The Žućko's left trophy awarded to the winner Reflex from Belgrade.

Venue

Qualified teams

Bracket

Qualifications

Quarterfinals

Semifinals

Final

References

External links 
 History of Radivoj Korać Cup

Radivoj Korać Cup (Serbia and Montenegro)
Radivoj
Serbia